
Year 1518 (MDXVIII) was a common year starting on Friday (link will display the full calendar) of the Julian calendar.

Exceptions

France 
In France, the year 1518 lasted from 4 April 1518 to 23 April 1519. Since Constantine (around year 325) and until the year 1565, the year was reckoned as beginning at Easter. For instance, the will of Leonardo da Vinci, drafted in Amboise on 23 April 1519, shows the legend "Given on the 23rd of April of 1518, before Easter".
 See Wikisource "1911 Encyclopædia Britannica/Easter"

Events 
<onlyinclude>

January–June 
 April 18 – The widowed Sigismund I the Old, King of Poland and Grand Duke of Lithuania, marries Milanese noblewoman Bona Sforza in Wawel Cathedral and she is crowned as Queen consort of Poland.
 May 26 – A transit of Venus occurs.

July–December 
 July – Dancing plague of 1518: A case of dancing mania breaks out in Strasbourg, in which many people die from constant dancing.
 August – Construction of the Manchester Grammar School is completed in England. 
 October 3 – The Treaty of London temporarily ensures peace in Western Europe.

Date unknown 
 The Rajput Mewar Kingdom under Rana Sanga achieves a major victory over Sultan Ibrahim Lodi of Delhi.
 A swarm of tropical fire ants devastates crops on Hispaniola.
 Erasmus publishes his Colloquies.
 Henricus Grammateus publishes Ayn neu Kunstlich Buech in Vienna, containing the earliest printed use of plus and minus signs for arithmetic.
The remnants of The Abbasid Caliphate (stationed in Egypt under the Mamluk Sultanate (Cairo)) hands over the title of caliph to the Ottoman Empire that had conquered Constantinople in 1453, 65 years earlier

Births 

 February 2 
 Johann Hommel, German astronomer and mathematician (d. 1562)
 Godfried van Mierlo, Dutch Dominican friar and bishop (d. 1587)
 February 7 – Johann Funck, German theologian (d. 1566)
 February 13 – Antonín Brus z Mohelnice, Moravian Catholic archbishop (d. 1580)
 February 20 – Georg, Count Palatine of Simmern-Sponheim, (d. 1569)
 February 21 – John of Denmark, Danish prince (d. 1532)
 February 28 – Francis III, Duke of Brittany, Duke of Brittany (d. 1536)
 March 8 – Sidonie of Saxony, Duchess of Brunswick-Calenberg (d. 1575)
 April 22 – Antoine de Bourbon, father of Henry IV of France (d. 1562)
 July 3 – Li Shizhen, Chinese physician, pharmacologist and mineralogist (d. 1593)
 August 8 – Conrad Lycosthenes, Alsatian humanist and encyclopedist (d. 1561)
 September/October – Tintoretto, Italian painter (d. 1594)
 November 26 – Guido Ascanio Sforza di Santa Fiora, Italian Catholic cardinal (d. 1564)
 December 13 – Clara of Saxe-Lauenburg, Princess of Saxe-Lauenburg and Duchess of Brunswick-Gifhorn by marriage (d. 1576)
 December 17 – Ernest III, Duke of Brunswick-Grubenhagen (d. 1567)
 December 19 – Enrique de Borja y Aragón, Spanish noble of the House of Borgia (d. 1540)
 date unknown
 James Halyburton, Scottish reformer (d. 1589)
 Hubert Languet, French diplomat and reformer (d. 1581)
 Edmund Plowden, English legal scholar (d. 1585)
 Mayken Verhulst (a.k.a. Marie Bessemers), Flemish artist (d. 1596 or 1599)
 possible – Catherine Howard, fifth queen consort of Henry VIII of England (b. between 1518 and 1524; d. 1542)

Deaths
 February 9 – Jean IV de Rieux, Breton noble and Marshal (b. 1447)
 May 31 – Elisabeth of Brandenburg-Ansbach-Kulmbach, German margravine (b. 1494)
 July 10 – Sibylle of Baden, Countess consort of Hanau-Lichtenberg (b. 1485)
 August 16 – Loyset Compère, French composer (b. c. 1445)
 August 27 – Joan of Naples, queen consort of Naples (b. 1478)
 November 20 
 Marmaduke Constable, English soldier (b. c. 1455)
 Pierre de La Rue, Flemish composer (b. c. 1452)
 November 24 – Vannozza dei Cattanei, mistress of Pope Alexander VI (b. 1442)
 December 5 – Gian Giacomo Trivulzio, Italian military commander (b. c. 1440)
 December 27 –  Mahmood Shah Bahmani II, sultan of the Bahmani Sultanate (b. c. 1470)
 date unknown
 Moxammat Amin of Kazan, khan of Kazan (b. c. 1469)
 Kabir, Indian mystic (b. 1440)
 Aruj, Ottoman corsair, brother of Hayreddin Barbarossa
 Guido Mazzoni, sculptor (b. c. 1445)
 Muhammad ibn Azhar ad-Din, sultan of Adal (assassinated) (b. c. 1473)
 Basil Solomon, Syriac Orthodox Maphrian of the East.

References